Holly Blanchard (born December 14, 1991) is an American beauty pageant titleholder from Derry, New Hampshire, who was crowned Miss New Hampshire 2015. She competed for the Miss America 2016 title in September 2015.

Pageant career

Early pageants
A fan of beauty pageants since early childhood, Blanchard began participating in the Miss America system at age 13 by entering the Miss New Hampshire's Outstanding Teen competition. She competed in the 2005, 2006, 2007, 2008, and 2009 teen pageants without taking the state title. Blanchard's best finish was as a Top-5 finalist in 2009. After five years, Blanchard moved up to the adult Miss New Hampshire pageants.

Vying for Miss New Hampshire
In October 2009, Blanchard won the Miss Souhegan Valley 2010 title. Entering as one of 26 qualifiers, Blanchard competed in the 2010 Miss New Hampshire pageant with the platform "Get Involved: Encouraging Youth Volunteerism" plus a dance and baton twirling to the Ike & Tina Turner song "River Deep – Mountain High" in the talent portion of the competition. She was not a Top-10 semi-finalist for the state title. She did not win a local qualifying pageant for the 2011 state pageant.

In January 2012, Blanchard won the Miss Granite State 2012 title. Entering as one of 27 qualifiers, Blanchard competed in the 2012 Miss New Hampshire pageant with the platform "Get Involved: Encouraging Youth Volunteerism" plus a dance and baton twirling performance in the talent portion of the competition. She was a Top-10 semi-finalist for the state crown.

On August 12, 2012, Blanchard won the Miss Lakes Region 2012 title. Entering as one of 28 qualifiers, Blanchard competed in the 2013 Miss New Hampshire pageant with the platform "Charity from the Heart: Giving Time to Make a Difference" plus a dance and baton twirling performance to the Gloria Estefan version of "Turn the Beat Around" in the talent portion of the competition.  She was a Top-10 semi-finalist for the state crown.

In August 2013, Blanchard won the Miss Greater Plaistow 2014 title. Entering as one of 28 qualifiers, Blanchard competed in the 2014 Miss New Hampshire pageant with the platform "Charity from the Heart: Giving Time to Make a Difference" plus a dance and baton twirling performance in the talent portion of the competition. She was named first runner-up to winner Megan Cooley. As first runner-up, Blanchard went on to represent New Hampshire at the National Sweetheart pageant in Hoopeston, Illinois. She was not a finalist for this national crown.

Miss New Hampshire 2015
On August 2, 2014, Blanchard was crowned Miss Rockingham County 2015. In her fifth try for the title and final year of eligibility, Blanchard entered the Miss New Hampshire pageant in May 2015 as one of 27 qualifiers for the state crown. Blanchard's competition talent was a dance and baton twirling routine to the song "Show Me How You Burlesque" by Christina Aguilera. Her platform is "Charity from the Heart: Giving Time to Make a Difference".

Blanchard won the competition on Saturday, May 2, 2015, when she received her crown from outgoing Miss New Hampshire titleholder Megan Cooley. She earned more than $10,000 in scholarship money, a fur coat, and other prizes from the state pageant. As Miss New Hampshire, her activities included public appearances across the state of New Hampshire.

Blanchard was New Hampshire's representative at the Miss America 2016 pageant in Atlantic City, New Jersey, in September 2015.

Early life and education
Blanchard is a native of Derry, New Hampshire, and a 2010 graduate of Pinkerton Academy. Her father is David Blanchard and her mother is Helen Blanchard. She has one younger sister, Briana.

Blanchard is a May 2014 graduate of the University of Connecticut where she majored in communications with a minor in sociology. She is currently the director of youth programs for Make-A-Wish New Hampshire.

References

External links

Miss New Hampshire official website

1991 births
Living people
American beauty pageant winners
Miss America 2016 delegates
People from Derry, New Hampshire
Pinkerton Academy alumni
University of Connecticut alumni